The 2015–16 Football League Championship (referred to as the Sky Bet Championship for sponsorship reasons) was the twelfth season of the Football League Championship under its current title and it was the twenty-fourth season under its current league structure.
The season started on 7 August 2015, and concluded on 7 May 2016. The fixtures were announced on 17 June 2015.

Teams 
A total of 24 teams contested the league, including 18 sides from the 2014–15 season, three relegated from the 2014–15 Premier League and three promoted from the 2014–15 Football League One.

Team changes
The following teams changed division after the 2014–15 season. Blackpool were relegated on 6 April after Rotherham United won against Brighton & Hove Albion. Bristol City secured promotion to the Championship on 14 April after beating Bradford City 6–0. Watford secured promotion to the Premier League on 25 April. Rotherham United won against Reading on 28 April to also send Millwall and Wigan Athletic to League One. Bournemouth secured promotion to the Premier League on the final day on 2 May against Charlton Athletic and won the 2014–15 Football League Championship after Watford slipped up against Sheffield Wednesday. Milton Keynes Dons secured promotion to the Championship after beating Yeovil Town 5–1 after Preston North End slipped up against Colchester United. On 9 May, Burnley became the first team to be relegated from the Premier League despite winning away 1–0 against Hull City as results on the day went against them. On 10 May, Queens Park Rangers were the second team to be relegated from the Premier League after suffering a 6–0 defeat to Manchester City.
On 24 May 2015, Hull City were the 3rd and final team to be relegated from the Premier League, finishing 18th in the Premier League. On the same day Preston North End achieved promotion at Wembley via the play-offs. On 25 May 2015, Norwich City won the playoff final, and were promoted to the Premier League.

To Championship
Promoted from League One
 Bristol City
 Milton Keynes Dons
 Preston North End
Relegated from Premier League
 Hull City
 Burnley
 Queens Park Rangers

From Championship
Relegated to League One
 Millwall
 Wigan Athletic
 Blackpool
Promoted to Premier League
 Bournemouth
 Watford
 Norwich City

Overview of the teams

Stadia and locations

Personnel and sponsoring

Managerial changes

Rule changes

The 2015–16 season was the last season under the initial Financial Fair Play rules before the switch to the new rules.  Changes to the Championship's financial fair play system allow clubs:
 Acceptable losses of £2 million during the 2015–16 season (down from £3 million during the 2014–15 season)
 Acceptable shareholder equity investment of £3 million during the 2015–16 season.
 Sanctions for exceeding the allowances take effect from the set of accounts due to be submitted on 1 December 2015 for the 2014–15 season.

League table

Play-offs 

The four teams that finished from third to sixth played off, with the winning team, Hull City, gaining the final promotion spot to the Premier League.

In the play-off semi-finals the third placed team played the sixth placed team and the fourth placed team played the fifth placed team. The team that finished in the higher league position played away in the first leg and played at home in the second leg. If the aggregate score was level after both legs, then extra time would be played. If the scores were still level, a penalty shoot-out decided the winner. The away goals rule did apply in the semi-finals. The semi-finals were held on 13–14 and 16–17 May.

The winners from the two semi-finals, Hull City and Sheffield Wednesday, played at Wembley Stadium on 28 May 2016 in the play-off final, where Hull City won 1–0. The game is known as the richest game in football as the winning club is guaranteed significantly increased payments e.g. in the 2016-17 season the minimum payment for participating in the Premier League was £95 million. Due to a new TV rights deal, the average payment for a newly promoted club stood at around £100 million.

Results

Season statistics

Top scorers

Clean sheets

Hat-tricks

Discipline

Player
Most yellow cards 14
Kyle McFadzean (Milton Keynes Dons)
Most red cards 2
Patrick Bauer (Charlton Athletic)
Fernando Forestieri (Sheffield Wednesday)
Bailey Wright (Preston North End)
Lewis Dunk (Brighton & Hove Albion)

Club
Most yellow cards 93
Leeds United
Most red cards 4 
 Milton Keynes Dons
 Bolton Wanderers
 Nottingham Forest

Monthly awards

Attendances

References

 
EFL Championship seasons
2015–16 Football League
2
Eng